Eddie McGill (born July 5, 1960) is a former American football tight end. He played for the St. Louis Cardinals from 1982 to 1983.

References

1960 births
Living people
American football tight ends
Western Carolina Catamounts football players
St. Louis Cardinals (football) players